Charpy may refer to:
Charpy impact test, a standard test to determine the amount of energy a material absorbs during fracture 
Georges Charpy (1865–1945), the French scientist and professor of metallurgy who created the Charpy impact test